George Tyson may refer to:

 George Tyson (1900s rugby league) (died 1937), English rugby league footballer who played in the 1900s
 George Tyson (rugby league, born 1993), rugby league footballer for Sheffield Eagles
 George Tyson (film director) (1973-2014), Kenyan filmmaker